The Gurk is a river in the Austrian state of Carinthia, a left tributary of the Drava. With a length of  it is the longest river running entirely within Carinthia.

The Gurk rises in the Nock Mountains (Gurktal Alps) range of the Central Eastern Alps, near the border with the Austrian state of Styria. Its sources are two small cirque lakes, the Gurksee and the Torersee near Albeck and the Turracher Höhe Pass, a protected area since 1981. Since both lake are frozen in the winter, they contain no fish.

It flows southwest to Ebene Reichenau and then turns eastwards running through Gnesau and the Gurktal valley to the market town of Gurk. Near Straßburg it again turns to the south, enters the Klagenfurt basin, and flows into the Drava west of Völkermarkt.

References

The information in this article is based on a translation of its German equivalent.
W. Honsig-Erlenburg, G. Wieser: Die Gurk und ihre Seitengewässer. Verlag des Naturwissenschaftlichen Vereins für Kärnten, Klagenfurt 1997, 

Rivers of Carinthia (state)
Rivers of Austria